Cecilia Lutwak-Mann (1900(?)-1987) was a Polish-British endocrinologist and physiologist.

Career 
She was educated at the University of Lviv (now in Ukraine), where she obtained a doctorate of medicine.  She studied the menstrual cycle, cellular respiration, and embryology, and served as chief scientific officer of the Agricultural Research Council of Great Britain.

Lutwak-Mann was known for discovering that the hormone progesterone acts on the placenta to control carbonic anhydrase synthesis. She also co-authored the then-reference text on male reproductive function and semen ("Male Reproductive Function and Semen: Themes and Trends in Physiology, Biochemistry and Investigative Andrology", 1981) with Thaddeus Mann.

Personal life 
Lutwak-Mann married Thaddeus Mann, in 1934, after they met in medical school.  She was Jewish, and moved to Britain in 1935 to continue her research at Cambridge.  She died in 1987.

References 

Year of birth uncertain
1987 deaths
Polish women scientists
Women physiologists
Women endocrinologists
British endocrinologists
Polish emigrants to the United Kingdom
British physiologists
20th-century Polish scientists
20th-century British scientists
20th-century British women scientists
University of Lviv alumni
20th-century Polish women